Pavol Mihalik (born 18 November 1976) is a Slovak former professional ice hockey player who played with HC Slovan Bratislava in the Slovak Extraliga.

References

Living people
HC Slovan Bratislava players
1976 births
Slovak ice hockey defencemen
Sportspeople from Topoľčany
Étoile Noire de Strasbourg players
Ducs d'Angers players
HK 36 Skalica players
Coventry Blaze players
Newcastle Vipers players
Slovak expatriate ice hockey people
Slovak expatriate sportspeople in England
Slovak expatriate sportspeople in France
Expatriate ice hockey players in France
Expatriate ice hockey players in England